Datatec Limited, also known as Datatec Group, is a Johannesburg, South Africa-based multinational information and communications technology (ICT) services group.  The group's main divisions are: Westcon International, dba Westcon-Comstor, a technology distributor; Logicalis, an IT managed services provider; and the companies Datatec Financial Services and Analysys Mason, which provide financing; and telecommunications, media and technology (TMT) consulting services, respectively.

It is listed on the Johannesburg stock exchange, and operates in more than 50 countries across six continents.

History
Datatec was founded in 1986 by Jens Montanana, who became the company's first CEO.  The company's shares started trading on the Johannesburg Stock Exchange in December 1994, with share code DTC.

In 1996, Datatec launched a joint venture with UUNET to form UUNET Africa, an internet service provider.

In 1997, the company began its international expansion and acquired UK-based IT firm Logical Networks, which later changed its name to Logicalis.

In June 1998, Datatec acquired a 92.5% stake in US distributor Westcon, for $160 million. The company then consolidated its five continent distribution business under the Westcon brand.

In 1999, Datatec acquired communications consultancy Mason Communications.

In November 2000, the company announced it was selling its stake in UUNET Africa to WorldCom.

In 2004, Datatec acquired UK-based telecommunications research and consultancy firm Analysys for £12.8 million. Analysys was merged with Mason Communications and the new company was renamed Analysys Mason Group (AMG).

In October 2006, the company was listed on the Alternative Investment Market (AIM) of the London Stock Exchange.

In May 2014, the company spun off Mason Advisory from Analysys Mason, to focus on IT, cloud, security and mobile technology consulting.

In June 2017, Datatec announced it was selling the North and Latin American operations of Westcon-Comstor, along with 10% of the remaining part of Westcon (Westcon International) to Fremont, CA-based IT supply chain services company Synnex, for a reported consideration of up to $830 million.

In October 2017, Datatec announced they were planning to delist their secondary listing on the London AIM market on December 8 of that year, due to limited liquidity of the shares on AIM.

In May 2018, Logicalis Group, a subsidiary of Datatec, has signed an agreement to acquire 100 percent of the issued share capital of Coasin, a Chilean ICT services provider that also operates in Peru.

In August 2020, Datatec has announced that its subsidiary Logicalis Latin America has acquired a 30% stake in Brazilian Kumulus.

In June 2021, Logicalis Group acquired Siticom, a 5G integrator based in Germany.

Companies
Datatec's companies are in three divisions:

Technology distribution
Westcon International – a value-added distributor of security, collaboration, networking and datacentre.

IT managed services
Logicalis – an information and communications technology infrastructure and service provider.

Consulting and financial services
Analysys Mason  – a global consultancy and research firm specializing in the telecommunications, media and technology (TMT) sector.
Datatec Financial Services – a financial services provider for customers and suppliers of Logicalis and Westcon-Comstor.

References

Information technology companies of South Africa
Companies based in Johannesburg